Yovanny Lara (born September 20, 1975) is a Dominican Republic former professional baseball pitcher.

External links

1975 births
Living people
Cape Fear Crocs players
Dominican Republic expatriate baseball players in Canada
Dominican Republic expatriate baseball players in the United States
Gulf Coast Expos players
Harrisburg Senators players
Jupiter Hammerheads players
Major League Baseball pitchers
Major League Baseball players from the Dominican Republic
Montreal Expos players
People from San Cristóbal Province
Vermont Expos players